Euskal Irrati Telebista (EITB, Basque Radio-television) is the Basque Autonomous Community's public broadcast service, which broadcasts throughout the Basque Country. Its main brand is Euskal Telebista (ETB, Basque Television).

EITB is the leading media group in the Basque Autonomous Community of Spain with four domestic television channels and five radio stations. Their channels are also broadcast in the whole Basque Country, and people in nearby territories such as Burgos (in Castile and León), Cantabria, Huesca (province) and Zaragoza (province) (in Aragon), La Rioja, and Pyrénées-Atlantiques (in France) can also get the signal. It has been running since 1982 and during this period it has established itself as a major media organisation, connecting with more than a million people every day. The majority of EITB's broadcasts deal with local news and entertainment.

In Francoist Spain, the Basque underground had an independent voice, Radio Euskadi, which operated on shortwave from two continents.

On 20 May 1982 the Basque Parliament unanimously approved the law that set up Euskal Irrati Telebista and on 23 November, the radio channel Euskadi Irratia started broadcasting. ETB, for its part, reached Basque households at midnight on 31 December 1982 with a presentation by the Basque Lehendakari Carlos Garaikoetxea and its programmes were regularized, starting from 16 February in the following year. At the time about 30 people worked in the ETB centre in Iurreta to provide programmes exclusively in Basque.

Several years later, ETB 2, its second flagship television channel, commenced operations on 31 May 1986 broadcasting in Spanish, and at the present time it has a further two international channels. Following an agreement between Sogecable and EITB, 87 million households all over Europe have been able to pick up ETB Sat from the Astra satellite since May 2001. It may be picked up via Sogecable's Digital Plus satellite-TV service throughout Spain. The EITB Group's fourth television channel is Canal Vasco, a medium specifically geared towards the Americas, where it reaches viewers through American DTH and cable companies.

Following the implementation of Digital terrestrial television, the Basque government allowed EITB to create two new digital television channels. The first, ETB 3, started broadcasting in October 2008, offering programming for children and youngsters in Basque. The second, ETB 4 was first expected to be a bilingual news channel, but was later redefined as a sports channel. Its launch was postponed but ETB 4 subsequently launched officially on 29 October 2014.

The EITB group also has five radio stations with more than 300,000 listeners every day - Euskadi Irratia, Radio Euskadi, Radio Vitoria, Euskadi Gaztea and EITB Musika respectively.

Iberia Flight 610 
On 19 February 1985, Iberia Flight 610, a Boeing 727 from Madrid to Bilbao, crashed onto an EITB antenna during approach to Bilbao Airport, causing the deaths of all 148 occupants inside the jet.

Budget
The Basque community has increased its 2015 budget to 124.6 million euro up from 107.6 million the year before.

Controversies 
Both EITB and ETB have been at the center of some controversy over their content and audiovisual productions.

EiTB Controversy (2017) 
In 2017, the ETB 1 channel broadcast a program called "Euskalduna naiz, eta zu?" and one of the episodes broadcast was the source of much controversy due to some statements that were made in it. The controversy was denounced by the Unión del Pueblo Navarro (UPN), the Popular Party (PP) and Covite, who announced that they would carry the matter went to the courts and the European Commission and the PSE-EE asked the public entity to be held accountable. The matter even reached the Spanish Senate. Finally EITB had to apologize for it.

Betizu (2022) 

In the year 2022 a small controversy arose with Betizu (2001-2011). The Betizu stars (presenters, actors, singers, etc.) were children and adolescents (child stars). As adults, some of Betizu stars spoke about the treatment they received on the program when they recorded it.

The singer and presenter Zuriñe Hidalgo was one of the many Betizu Stars, where she has been since she was 11 years old. In the year 2022, as an adult, she recognized that it was not easy being part of Betizu being so young and criticized the program and the ETB 1 channel for certain facts, declaring that "she suffered discrimination in situations ranging from the way she was dressed, to the way they treated her".

Television 
ETB 1 - General channel in Basque language.
ETB 2 - General channel in Spanish language.
ETB 3 - Youth channel in Basque language.
ETB 4 - Bilingual entertainment channel in both Spanish and Basque.
ETB Sat - Worldwide channel, both in Basque and Spanish languages.
Canal Vasco - International channel aimed at Latin America, both in Basque and Spanish languages.

Radio 
Euskadi Irratia - News/Talk radio station in Basque language
Radio Euskadi - News/Talk radio station in Spanish language
Radio Vitoria - News/Talk radio station aimed at the city of Vitoria in Spanish language
Euskadi Gaztea - Music radio station in the Basque language aimed at the youth
EITB Musika - Cultural and soft music radio station in Basque and Spanish

References

External links

  
  
  

 
Mass media in the Basque Country (autonomous community)
Spanish radio networks
Television networks in Spain
FORTA
Multilingual broadcasters
Television channels and stations established in 1982
1982 establishments in Spain
Government-owned companies of Spain